Tamara Stepanovna Safonova ( Fedosova; later Pogozheva and Safonova; ; born 24  June 1946) is a retired Russian diver. She competed in the 3-metre springboard at the 1964, 1968 and 1972 Summer Olympics and finished in fifth, second and seventeenth place, respectively. 

She won bronze medals in the springboard at three consecutive European championships: in 1966, 1970 and 1974. She was a Soviet champion in this event in 1964, 1966–1968 and 1970–1974.

Her husband, Mikhail Safonov, is a Russian diver who competed at the 1964 and 1968 Olympics.

References

1946 births
Living people
Russian female divers
Soviet female divers
Olympic divers of the Soviet Union
Divers at the 1964 Summer Olympics
Divers at the 1968 Summer Olympics
Divers at the 1972 Summer Olympics
Olympic silver medalists for the Soviet Union
Olympic medalists in diving
Medalists at the 1968 Summer Olympics
Universiade medalists in diving
Universiade gold medalists for the Soviet Union
Medalists at the 1973 Summer Universiade